Carne is a hamlet in the civil parish of St Anthony-in-Meneage, Cornwall, England, UK.
Gillan Creek is a part of the Lower Fal and Helford Intertidal Site of Special Scientific Interest.

Carne lies within the Cornwall Area of Outstanding Natural Beauty (AONB).

References

Hamlets in Cornwall